The Warsangali is a major Somali sub clan, part of the Harti clan which itself belongs to one of the largest Somali clan-families - the Darod. In the Somali language, the name Warsangali means "bringer of good news." The Warsangeli primarily inhabit the Sanaag, Bari , Lower Juba, Gedo, Bay and Bakool regions.

Overview

In 1848, C. J. Cruttenden reported that the Warsangali and Majeerteen territories were the most commercially valuable in the Nugaal Valley, and that Banians from India had become successful exporters. The Cal Madow chain of mountains, which is partially inside the clan's territory, extends to the cities of Bosaso (the capital of the Bari region) and Ceerigaabo (the capital of the Sanaag region) both in an east and west direction.
An article titled "Seychellois rekindle ties with Sultan of Somaliland" which was featured in one of the newspapers of the Republic of Seychelles captures a glimpse of Warsangeli history. It writes, "the Warsengeli Sultanate has been in existence for the last two hundred years."

Groups
Shacni-cali was the smallest of the 13 Darawiish administrative divisions, and was exclusively composed of Warsangeli.
Garbo Darawiish was a second-smallest segment of the 13 Darawiish administrative divisions, and was half Warsangeli, half Dhulbahante.
Burcadde-godwein was the seventh largest of the dozen Darawiish administrative divisions, and was half Warsangeli, half Dhulbahante.
Maakhir was a proto-state during the 2000s chiefly inhabited by Warsangeli.

Notable members
Abdilahi Qablan, first representative of Las Qorey for USP party
Mohamud Caddaanweyne, first representative of Jidali for USP party
Nuurxaashi Cali: commander of one of the two Garbo Darawiish subdivisions, named after himself 
 Ismail Kharras: mentioned in the Geoffrey Archer's 1916 important members of Darawiish haroun list
Gerad Abdulahi: first Garaad of the Warsangali in the late 13th century
Gerad Hamar Gale: second sultan of the Warsangali 
Mohamoud Ali Shire (1897–1960): sultan of the Warsangeli; was exiled into Seychelles islands in 1920 for 7 years by the British Empire
Abdillahi Mohammed Ahmed (1926-1993): known as Qablan, former Under-Secretary of Finance and former Minister of National Planning (1967-1969)
Farah Mohamed Jama Awl (1937-1991): respected Somali author
Omar Fateh: first Somali and Muslim State Senator in Minnesota
Fatima Jibrell: founder of the Horn relief now known as ADESO
Jibril Ali Salad (2006-2009): President of  Maakhir State of Somalia
Said Hassan Shire (2014–2015): former speaker of Puntland House of Representatives
Mohamed Nuur Giriig (1935-2002): classical Somali singer, specializing in traditional Somali music
Abdullahi Ahmed Jama: former Minister of Justice, former commander of the Somali National Army of Somalia and the President of  Maakhir State of Somalia
Ali Aden Lord: first Somali MP and later the Interior Minister of Kenya
Ahmed Ismail Hussein: singer, songwriter, composer, instrumentalist; also known as King of Oud
Gamal Mohamed Hassan (2016-): Minister of Planning, Investment and Economic Development of Federal Government of Somalia
Faisal Hawar: Chairman of International Somalia Development Foundation, CEO of Maakhir Resource Company

References

External links
Warsangeli Sultanate
Warsangali genealogy

Darod
Somali clans